Ilan-dili is a 1926 Soviet silent adventure film directed by Ivane Perestiani. It is the sequel to the film The Savur Grave.

Cast
 Sofia Jozeffi as Duniasha  
 Pavel Yesikovsky as Misha  
 Svetlana Luiks as Oqsana  
 Kador Ben-Salim as Tom Jackson  
 Marius Jakobini

References

Bibliography 
 Rollberg, Peter. Historical Dictionary of Russian and Soviet Cinema. Scarecrow Press, 2008.

External links 
 

1926 films
Soviet silent feature films
Georgian-language films
Films directed by Ivan Perestiani
Soviet black-and-white films
Soviet adventure films
1926 adventure films
Silent adventure films
Soviet-era films from Georgia (country)